Padauk Musical, also known as Padauk Ka Tae Gita, is a 2020 Burmese romantic musical film starring Sai Sai Kham Leng, Poe Mamhe Thar and Aye Myat Thu. The film produced and distributed by Frenzo Production premiered in Myanmar on March 5, 2020 and became one of the highest-grossing films.

Synopsis 
"Music" never gets old and so does "Love". The story is telling that music and love are the most fundamental companions regardless of the time.

Cast 
 Sai Sai Kham Leng as Aggar Sai
 Poe Mamhe Thar as Poe Maddi
 Aye Myat Thu as Wutyi Cho
 Kyaw Thu as U Khin Maung Set
 Zin Wine as U Thet
 Cho Pyone as Phwar Phwar
 Soe Myat Thuzar as Khin Nwe
 May Thinzar Oo as Daw Mya Oo

References

External links 

2020 films
2020s Burmese-language films
Burmese romantic drama films
Films shot in Myanmar
2020s romantic musical films
2020 romance films